The 2017–18 Ball State Cardinals men's basketball team represented Ball State University during the 2017–18 NCAA Division I men's basketball season. The Cardinals, led by fifth-year head coach James Whitford, played their home games at Worthen Arena as members of the West Division of the Mid-American Conference. They finished the season 19–13, 10–8 to finish in third place in the MAC West division. They lost in the quarterfinals of the MAC tournament to Kent State.

Previous season
The Cardinals finished the 2016–17 season 21–13, 11–7 in MAC play to finish in a tie for the West Division championship. They lost to Akron in the semifinals of the MAC tournament. They were invited to the CollegeInsider.com Tournament where they lost to Fort Wayne in the first round.

Schedule and results

|-
!colspan=9 style=| Exhibition

|-
!colspan=9 style=| Non-conference regular season

|-
!colspan=9 style=| MAC regular season

|-
!colspan=9 style=| MAC tournament

See also
 2017–18 Ball State Cardinals women's basketball team

References

Ball State
Ball State Cardinals men's basketball seasons
Ball State
Ball State